Peter Goelet Gerry (September 18, 1879 – October 31, 1957) was an American lawyer and politician who served in the United States House of Representatives and later, as a U.S. Senator from Rhode Island. He is the only U.S. Senator in American history to lose re-election and later reclaim his Senate seat from the person who had defeated him.

Early life
Gerry was born on September 18, 1879 in Manhattan, New York City, to Elbridge Thomas Gerry and Louisa Matilda Livingston Gerry. He was a great-grandson of Elbridge Gerry, the fifth Vice President of the United States (who had given his name to the term gerrymandering). His father was worth an estimated $25,000,000 (equivalent to $ today) in 1912. Through his paternal grandmother, Hannah Green Goelet, he was a great-great-grandson of real estate investor Peter Goelet. His father, Elbridge T. Gerry, was first cousins with Robert Goelet and Ogden Goelet.

In the summer of 1899, Gerry and his brother Robert were tutored by William Lyon Mackenzie King, who later became the Prime Minister of Canada In 1901, Gerry graduated from Harvard University. He studied law and was admitted to the Rhode Island bar in 1906.

Career
Gerry inherited large real estate holdings from his mother, who died in 1920, which Gerry and his elder brother agreed to sell in 1922. In a 1918 trust agreement, the brothers and their sisters, Angelica Livingston Gerry and Mabel Gerry, could all exchange ownership in Gerry real estate for stock in the Gerry Estates, Inc.

Political career
Gerry was elected to the United States House of Representatives for Rhode Island's 2nd District as a Democrat from 1913 to 1915.  He was an unsuccessful candidate for re-election in 1914, but he was elected to the United States Senate in 1916 and served from 1917 to 1929.  He was the first United States senator from Rhode Island elected by popular vote rather than by the state senate.  He was also the first Rhode Island Democrat United States senator to serve since 1859.

From 1919 to 1929, Gerry was the Democratic Whip. He has been described as a "Wilsonian Moralist". In 1928 he was an unsuccessful candidate for re-election, but in 1934 he was again elected to the U.S Senate over the man who had defeated him six years earlier. He was not a candidate for re-election in 1946 and served until 1947.

Personal life

First marriage
In 1910, Gerry married Mathilde Scott Townsend (1885–1949), the daughter of Richard H. Townsend (1850–1902), the President of the Erie and Pittsburgh Railroad, and the granddaughter of William Lawrence Scott (1828–1891), a Pennsylvania railroad and coal magnate who was a member of the U.S. House of Representatives from Pennsylvania. They did not have children and divorced in 1925.  Later that same year, Mathilde married Sumner Welles (1892–1961), who was seven years her junior, and who had divorced his wife, Esther Slater, in 1923.  At the time, rumors circulated around Washington that Sumner and Mathilde were having an affair that wrecked both their marriages.

Second marriage
On October 22, 1925, Gerry married Edith Stuyvesant Dresser (1873–1958), the widow of George Washington Vanderbilt II (1862–1914). Edith, a daughter of Maj. George Warren Dresser, was the mother of Cornelia Stuyvesant Vanderbilt (1900–1976), who married John Francis Amherst Cecil, son of Lord William Cecil and Mary Rothes Margaret Tyssen-Amherst, 2nd Baroness Amherst of Hackney.

Death
Gerry died on October 31, 1957 in Providence, Rhode Island. His elder brother, Robert Livingston Gerry, died several hours later in Delhi, New York. He was buried at St James Cemetery, Hyde Park, New York. His widow died on December 21, 1958.

References

Further reading

External links
 Schlup, Leonard, "Wilsonian Moralist: Senator Peter G. Gerry and the Crusade for the League of Nations," Rhode Island History 58 (February 2000)
The Diary of William Lyon Mackenzie King
References to Peter Gerry and Robert Gerry in Mackenzie King diary

|-

|-

|-

|-

|-

|-

|-

1879 births
1957 deaths
Democratic Party members of the United States House of Representatives from Rhode Island
Democratic Party United States senators from Rhode Island
Gerry family
Goelet family
Harvard University alumni
Livingston family
Politicians from New York City
Lawyers from New York City